Benjamin James Sobieski (born May 3, 1979) is a former American football player. He attended Mahtomedi Senior High School and the University of Iowa before being drafted in the fifth round of the 2003 NFL Draft (number 151 overall) by the Buffalo Bills.

A Parade and SuperPrep All-American who also lettered in track and hockey, Sobieski's career was hampered by injuries. He spent six years at Iowa under two head coaches (Hayden Fry and Kirk Ferentz), missing both the 1999 and 2000 seasons due to shoulder injuries.

After being released by Buffalo, Sobieski was signed to the practice squad of the San Francisco 49ers. He was brought up to the regular team, but never played due to injury.

References

External links
NFL player profile
Pro Football Reference profile

1979 births
American football offensive guards
Buffalo Bills players
Iowa Hawkeyes football players
Living people
Players of American football from Saint Paul, Minnesota
People from Mahtomedi, Minnesota